Aki Kawamura (川村亜紀 Kawamura Aki, born October 15, 1980) is a Japanese bikini model and television idol.

She debuted in 1999 with the Yellow Cab Talent Agency. After some time out of the public eye, she joined the Spice talent agency and resumed her career.  Kawamura's DVDs include Fuji Television Visual Queen of the Year '00 'Aki Kawamura' Aloha Paradise.

Television appearances
 Shiritsu tantei Hama Maiku (NTV)
 Kaidan hyaku monogatari (Fuji Television)
 Yo ni mo kimyou na monogatari (Fuji Television)
 Ai wa seigi (TV Asahi)

References
 Up-and-coming Japanese Beauties (Archived 2009-10-24)
 Answers.com
 lifecity.ne.jp 
 Amazon search results 
 Aki Kawamura at Model Imago

Japanese gravure idols
Japanese actresses
Living people
1980 births